Bollman or Bollmann is a surname.

People with the surname Bollman include:
Charles Harvey Bollman (1868–1889), American naturalist 
Eric Bollman (1769–1821), German physician
Harry Bollman (1902–1984), Australian rules footballer
Jim Bollman (born 1954), American college football coach
Ryan Bollman (born 1972),  American film and television actor
Wendel Bollman (1814–1884), American civil engineer

People with the surname Bollmann include:
Albert Bollmann (1889–1959), German footballer
Ernst Bollmann (1899–1974), German politician
Gerd Bollmann (1947–2017), German politician 
Hannelore Bollmann (born 1925),  German actress
Horst Bollmann (1925–2014), German film and television actor
Markus Bollmann (born 1981), German footballer

See also
Ex parte Bollman, 1807 United States Supreme Court case
Bollman Hat Company
Bolman (disambiguation)
Boltzmann (disambiguation)
Gary Ballman (1940–2004), American football player